Aksharathettu is an Indian Malayalam television series broadcast on Mazhavil Manorama since 6 July 2020. Ishani Ghosh and Dharish Jayaseelan are the main protagonists of the series. 

From October 26, 2020 this series was merged with Suryakanthi which premiered in the channel from 17 August 2020.
 
Shalu Kurian received the Kerala State TV award for second-best actress for the show Aksharathettu. Ambootti won the award for best male dubbing artiste for Aksharathettu and Suryakanthi.

Plot 
Lakshmi Sivasankar goes to Madras to pursue a career in the film industry, where she meets Ramkumar, a popular actor. Their relationship progresses and Lakshmi becomes pregnant with Ramkumar's child. Soon he abandons her and Lakshmi gives birth to a son. Believing that the child is born dead, Lakshmi resumes her career and seeks vengeance on Ramkumar. Due to his influence, she struggles in the film industry but manages to bag a challenging role of a mute girl in a film by director Zakhir. She now takes the name Jayalakshmi and believes the film will be a hit. On the other hand, Karan and Arjun, two street boys, find Lakshmi's son and raise him with the help of a poor family. The boys use him to beg for money. Ramkumar marries the daughter of the chief minister, Malarmathi who is now aware of Ramkumar's illegitimate child. Lakshmi and Ramkumar discover that their son is alive, and Ramkumar seeks to kill him. Malarmathi hires a private detective agency to find the child before Ramkumar and bribes some people to badmouth Lakshmi and Zakhir so that they marry.

Cast

Aksharathettu 
 Ishani Gosh as Lakshmi
 Dharish Jayaseelan as Ramkumar
 Rafi as Zakeer
 Shalu Kurian as Rani Akka
 Mahalakshmi  as Malarmathi 
 Rekha Ratheesh as Vasundhara Devi
 Jose as Justice Shivashankar
 Om Kanojiya as Karan
 Joshua Parisutham as Arjun
 Bindu Krishna as Alakananda

Sooryakanthi 
Shirin as Vaiga
Subramanian Gopalakrishnan as Varun
Vinayak as Vishal
Kannur Vasutty as Sooryanarayanan
Balan Parakkal as Vijaya Varma
Vyjayanthi as Bhanumathi
Sabitha Nair as Kokila
Harsha Nair as Mrudula
Maya Viswanath
Ramesh Kotttayam as Vishwanathan
Krishnaprasad as Ashokan
Lekshmipriya as Megha
Vijay Induchoodan as Surya
Lakshmi Prasad as Hema Sumesh
Vismaya as Swapna Sumesh
Ishani Gosh as Lakshmi
Jose as Justice Shivashankar
Bindu Krishna as Alakananda
Stelna

References

External links
 Official website

2020 Indian television series debuts
Malayalam-language television shows
Mazhavil Manorama original programming